Ling Xiaoyu  is a fictional character from the Tekken franchise by Bandai Namco Entertainment. Following her debut in Tekken 3 (1997), she has appeared in every subsequent game in the series. Xiaoyu is a cheerful Chinese teenager who is a friend of the series' main protagonist, Jin Kazama, as well as a potential love interest, while trying to interfere with the affairs of the increasingly corrupt Mishima family. 

She has appeared on official Tekken merchandise and alternative media such as the 2011 animated feature film Tekken: Blood Vengeance, where she and Alisa Bosconovitch were the main protagonists, in addition to appearances in many Bandai Namco crossover games, and has received critical and public reception for factors such as her personality, sex appeal, and representation of a strong female character in video games.

Design and gameplay
Ling Xiaoyu's age (sixteen) in her series debut was the result of the Tekken 3 development team wanting a younger girl in the game, as most of the game's female characters were "more than 25 years old". She was created alongside protagonist Jin Kazama by Namco artist Yoshinari Mizushima after he graduated from college, with the character's design being a great surprise to the Tekken staff. Her black hair is kept in pigtails throughout her series appearances, while her costumes have varied from a modified cheongsam in Tekken 6 to a kogal-style schoolgirl uniform in the 2011 computer-animated film Tekken: Blood Vengeance. 

Tekken: Blood Vengeance screenwriter Dai Satō said in 2011 that he had chosen her as one of the two lead characters because he felt she "symbolize[d] the older Tekken games". Katsuhiro Harada was surprised by the decision to use Xiaoyu, believing she was not that popular within the main demography. Satō had been a fan of the Tekken games and played the arcade version of the third installment as part of research. As he discussed the handling of these leads with Harada, Satō claims he wanted to use these characters since they come across as weak, something which he believes films require in order to undergo a character arc, common in coming-of-age story stories. The relationship between Xiaoyu and Alisa was compared to the ones of a buddy film. Xiaoyu was written to be relatable to the audience and balance the more supernatural elements in the process. Xiaoyu's relationship with Alisa was made so that the latter develops a "soul" as the film progresses as she is a robot. 

Xiaoyu was first voiced by Yumi Tōma in Japanese. Starting with Blood Vengeance, the role was taken by Maaya Sakamoto. The staff from Tekken was glad with this new cast. Director Yoichi Mohri enjoyed Sakamoto's performance, believing her work turned Xiaoyu into a beautiful woman.

Her fighting style is officially listed as "various Chinese martial arts", in particular Baguazhang and Piguaquan. In his 2003 book Kung Fu Cult Masters, author Leon Hunt wrote that her style "draws extensively on wushu, with graceful balletic sweeps and wide, extravagant stances—like Lei [Wulong], she is a 'shapes'-based fighter and harder to learn than the Japanese or Korean boxers." Her specialities are evasion moves that emphasize speed over strength; according to Simon Hill of Prima Games, her "main strength lies in her speed ... she's the fastest character in Tekken 3." However, GameSpy opined that her offense in Tekken 6 was "rather lacking ... most of the damage she dishes out will probably be from jabs you slip in between her evasive maneuvers." IGN said of her style in Tekken Tag Tournament: "Who says it’s bad to fight like a little schoolgirl? Xiaoyu’s graceful style and fancy setups make her a powerful fighter among the Tekken universe."

Appearances

Tekken series
A sixteen-year-old Chinese martial artist, Ling Xiaoyu was tutored by her elderly relative, Wang Jinrei, at a young age; he believed that she could achieve true greatness, yet was frustrated by her flippant attitude. She learns of Heihachi Mishima's zaibautsu and thinks her dream of owning an amusement park reality. He agrees to build the park should she win the company-sponsored King of Iron Fist tournament. Xiaoyu moves into the Mishima Zaibatsu's Japan complex and enrolls at the Mishima Polytechnic School, where she befriends Miharu Hirano and Heihachi's grandson Jin. Heihachi additionally teaches her trained giant panda, simply named "Panda", to fight so she is able to serve as Xiaoyu's bodyguard. This encourages Xiaoyu to view Heihachi as something of a grandfather figure.

Xiaoyu remains a ward of the Mishima Zaibatsu during the events of Tekken 4, she enters the fourth King of the Iron Fist Tournament in hopes of reconnecting with Jin and uncovering the Mishima Zaibatsu’s nefarious deeds. Xiaoyu is saved from Heihachi's evil plans by Yoshimitsu, who informs her of the Mishima family's tragic history. Xiaoyu therefore takes it upon herself to try and save the Mishima family, and as the fifth tournament commence. Before she can try to stop Jin, the Mishima Zaibatsu pushes towards militarization and declares a worldwide war. When the sixth tournament is announced, Xiaoyu enters in attempt to save Jin's soul from evil.

After Jin goes and Heihachi regains control of the Mishima Zaibatsu, Xiaoyu infiltrates the Mishima Zaibatsu building to find information on Jin's disappearance. Xiaoyu meets Claudio Serafino. Claudio instead led her to the roof and challenged her to a fight. Not backing down, Xiaoyu accepts the challenge unaware of Claudio's true plan.

Outside of the main series, Ling Xiaoyu has appeared in numerous noncanonical Tekken spinoff games, including Tekken Tag Tournament and Tekken Tag Tournament 2, Tekken Revolution, and Street Fighter X Tekken.

Other games
Outside of the Tekken series, Xiaoyu appeared in Namco crossover titles such as the tactical role-player Project X Zone and its sequel; the mobile game Full Bokko Heroes X; and Smash Court Tennis Pro Tournament 2, in which she was unlockable along with Heihachi and Cassandra Alexandra and Raphael Sorel from the Soulcalibur series. Xiaoyu and fellow Tekken character Alisa Bosconovitch were featured on a downloadable aircraft skin variant designed by former Square Enix character designer Shunya Yamashita for the action-flight simulation games Ace Combat: Assault Horizon and Ace Combat: Infinity. Her Tekken 6 costume was included as downloadable content for raising-simulation title The Idolmaster SP, and as part of a selection of downloadable Tekken costumes for Soulcalibur V. She also appears in SNK's mobile phone game The King of Fighters All Star. Xiaoyu appears as a Spirit in the Nintendo crossover video game Super Smash Bros. Ultimate. Xiaoyu appears as a playable character in Fist of the North Star Legends ReVIVE.

Media and merchandise

Ling Xiaoyu was omitted from the 1998 anime film Tekken: The Motion Picture, only appearing in its opening sequence. She is a lead character in Tekken: Blood Vengeance, in which she is a student who transfers to Kyoto International School after being recruited by G Corporation's Anna Williams to spy on a fellow student and film-exclusive character named Shin Kamiya. Xiaoyu meets Alisa Bosconovitch, who was sent by Jin Kazama to perform the same task, and the girls become friends but are later forced to turn on one another after Shin is captured by an unknown assailant, but Alisa spares Xiaoyu's life. After Xiaoyu is abandoned by Anna, she and Alisa take refuge in their teacher Lee Chaolan's mansion. Xiaoyu was voiced by Maaya Sakamoto in Japanese and Carrie Keranen in English. Xiaoyu appears as a supporting character in the Tekken: Bloodline animated series for Netflix, voiced by Maaya Sakamoto in Japanese and Faye Mata in English.

Xiaoyu was among many Tekken female characters portrayed by models for a 2006 Maxim photoshoot. She was played by actress Xuan Thanh Nguyen in a 2012 Tekken Tag Tournament 2 live-action short film that starred performers from stunt company Wild Stunts Europe, while model Claudia Alan portrayed Xiaoyu in a Tekken Tag Tournament 2 "Girl Power" trailer that premiered at Comic-Con 2012.

Her comic book appearances includes Tekken Forever, Tekken: Tatakai no Kanatani, Tekken Saga, Tekken Comic, and Tekken: Blood Feud. In 1998, Epoch Co. released an action figure based on her Tekken 3 design that was packaged with a miniature Panda figure. Namco's 2006 six-figure Tekken "Game Character Goods Collection" package included Xiaoyu from Tekken 5. A Xiaoyu bishōjo figure was released by Kotobukiya as part of their 2013 Tekken Tag Tournament 2 toyline.

Reception

Popularity
In 2005, Xiaoyu was one of five characters nominated for G4's Video Game Vixens "Baddest Good Girl" award, which was won by Rikku of Final Fantasy X. Readers of the Polish edition of GameStar voted Xiaoyu eighth in a poll for the title of "Miss Video Game World", and the second-highest placed Tekken character behind Nina Williams. Digital Spy readers voted Xiaoyu their fourth-favorite Tekken character in 2012, behind Nina, Hwoarang, and Jin Kazama. In an official fan poll held by Namco, Xiaoyu was the sixth-most requested Tekken character for inclusion in the upcoming crossover fighter Tekken X Street Fighter, receiving 12.23% of 88,280 votes. Across the series, both Jin and Xiaoyu hold a close relationship. This resulted in fans asking Harada if they will be in a romantical one. However, Harada refrained from confirming or denying it. Her popularity in China might have contributed to Chinese fashion.

The character has also been used in a crossover with Patlabor and Tekken Tag Tournament 2 Unlimited in 2014. Live-action Patlabor actress Mano Erina cosplayed as Xiaoyu in 2014. Akira Izumino, the main character played by Mano, is a fighting game maniac especially of Tekken resulting in Xiaoyu cosplay. From May 21, 2014 collaboration posters with quizzes that people can understand by watching the movie were be posted at stores nationwide where Tekken Tag Tournament 2 Unlimited is installed. Her guest appearance in Smash Court Tennis Pro Tournament 2 was ranked 42nd in GamesRadar's list of "55 awesome character cameos".

Critical response

The character has received positive critical and public reception. Upon her debut in Tekken 3, Next Generation commented that she and fellow Tekken 3 character Julia Chang "conform to different and equally depressing 'cute schoolgirl' stereotypes", while PlayStation Universe felt she was unique in the franchise due to her innocence rarely seen in other characters. Robert Workman of GameDaily named Ling Xiaoyu as one of his favorite female Asian video game characters, calling her "a joy to behold". GameDaily rated her among the "chicks that will kick your ass": "If you mistake Ling Xiaoyu for an innocent schoolgirl, prepare to get your nose schooled." In yet another article by GameDaily, they complimented her as "hot," and that she "knows how to dress". Writing for ImpulseGamer, model Tara Babcock called Xiaoyu her favorite Tekken character due to her moves and most notably her hairstyle. MSN said of the character made the cheongsam fashionable again, and reminded the world that girls in tight clothing can still pull off some amazing fighting moves. Kevin Wong of Complex rated her the eleventh-best Tekken character in 2013: "Ling Xiaoyu is what happens when you put an 8-year-old girl's mind into a 19-year-old girl's body. With her plaid-skirted school uniform, barely legal hairstyle, and butt slapping shenanigans, Ling is somehow both kawaii and creepy." IGN called Xiaoyu "a fun character to use", while "everyone loves a schoolgirl that can kick some booty." FHM listed Xiaoyu and Chun-Li as one of the "10 awesome fantasy fights" in Street Fighter X Tekken. Anthony Taormina of Game Rant called Xiaoyu "not just a representative of the strong female fighters in Tekken, but in video games in general", but in describing what he considered the unrealistic depiction of students in video games ("A peppy individual who enjoys nothing more than dabbling in deadly martial arts during their free periods"), David Meikleham of GamesRadar commented on Xiaoyu: "Instead, she’d be spending all her downtime writing essays, revising and generally making her brow as furrowed as possible." Stakester praised the handling and impact Xiaoyu has in the fighting game genre as a result of her charming personality and dream.

There was also response to Xiaoyu's character outside games. For Tekken: Blood Vengeance, Scott Foy of Dread Central said in his review of the film, "I was constantly laughing at ... those peculiar moments where Ling’s behavior around [Alisa] sure made it seem like she wanted to be much more than just best friends." In criticizing the film's plot, Charles Webb of MTV.com said, "Ling and Shin are simply pieces in a larger, mostly incomprehensible game being played by father and son Kazuya Mishima and Jin Kazama." Capsule Monsters criticized how Xiaoyu loses importance in the movie in the climax when the Mishimas start fighting. Nevertheless, he still found earlier scenes about her search for Shin Kamiya alongside Alisa to be hilarious in an accidental way. Spong was more negative, criticizing her adventure which started Alisa's character arc which came across as fanservice such as one where Xiaoyu is nearly naked in company of her. For Bloodline, Xiaoyu was listed as a wanted character for her relationship with Jin and how comical was the fact she has a pet named Panda.

See also
List of Tekken characters

References

External link

Female characters in video games
Fictional Baguazhang practitioners
Fictional Chinese people in video games
Fictional martial artists in video games
Fictional female martial artists
Fictional Han people
Fictional Piguaquan practitioners
Namco protagonists
Teenage characters in video games
Tekken characters
Woman soldier and warrior characters in video games
Video game bosses
Video game characters introduced in 1997